Conus alrobini is a species of sea snail, a marine gastropod mollusk in the family Conidae, the cone snails, cone shells or cones.

These snails are predatory and venomous. They are capable of "stinging" humans.

Description
The length  of the shell attains 105 mm.

Distribution
This marine species of cone snail is endemic and occurs off Central Vietnam

References

 Thach N.N. (2016). Vietnamese new mollusks. Seashells – Land snails – Cephalopods. With 59 new species. 205 pp. Published by the author. page(s): 53

External links
 

alrobini
Gastropods described in 2016